Arthur Kalinovich Stepanyan (born on 14 April 1987) is a former Armenian football defender and a referee. He was born in Russia, holds Russian citizenship and played most of his career there.

Club career
He played 3 seasons in the Russian Football National League for FC Sokol Saratov and FC Chernomorets Novorossiysk.

Referee career
Upon retirement as a player, he worked as a referee in the third-tier Russian Professional Football League from 2015 to 2017.

External links
 

1987 births
Sportspeople from Vladikavkaz
Russian people of Armenian descent
Living people
Russian footballers
Armenian footballers
Armenia under-21 international footballers
Association football defenders
FC Sokol Saratov players
FC Pyunik players
FC Saturn Ramenskoye players
FC Spartak-UGP Anapa players
FC Amkar Perm players
FC Chernomorets Novorossiysk players
FC Gornyak Uchaly players
FC Tyumen players
FC Orenburg players
FC Neftekhimik Nizhnekamsk players
Armenian Premier League players
Russian football referees